Arthur Lennox Jones (February 7, 1906 – November 25, 1980) was a pitcher in Major League Baseball. He pitched in one game for the Brooklyn Dodgers on April 23, 1932. He worked one inning and gave up two hits and two runs. He attended Furman University, later served in the US Army during World War II, was a member of the South Carolina House of Representatives and was elected Mayor of Kershaw, South Carolina.

References

External links

1906 births
1980 deaths
Brooklyn Dodgers players
Major League Baseball pitchers
Baseball players from South Carolina
Hartford Senators players
Jersey City Skeeters players
Albany Senators players
Kansas City Blues (baseball) players
Tulsa Oilers (baseball) players
Birmingham Barons players
Syracuse Chiefs players
Williamsport Grays players
Toronto Maple Leafs (International League) players
Elmira Pioneers players
Furman Paladins baseball players
People from Kershaw, South Carolina
United States Army personnel of World War II
Members of the South Carolina House of Representatives
Mayors of places in South Carolina